Atractothrips is a genus of thrips in the family Phlaeothripidae.

Species
 Atractothrips bradleyi
 Atractothrips mockfordi

References

Phlaeothripidae
Thrips
Thrips genera